The Anguilla Channel is a strait in the Caribbean Sea. It separates the island of Anguilla (a British Overseas Territory) in the north from the Collectivity of Saint Martin, an overseas collectivity of France on the island of Saint Martin, in the south.

Ecology
A coral reef in the channel named Chris's Reef was discovered in 2009. It contains the remains of vehicles, which may have been destroyed by Hurricane Luis in 1995 and consequently placed into the reef for disposal.

Transport
 There is a regular ferry service between Blowing Point, Anguilla and Marigot, Saint Martin

See also
1996 France – United Kingdom Maritime Delimitation Agreements
Guadeloupe Passage

References

Bodies of water of Anguilla
Landforms of the Collectivity of Saint Martin
International straits
Straits of the Caribbean
Landforms of Saint Martin (island)
Anguilla–Collectivity of Saint Martin border